Picea crassifolia, the Qinghai spruce, is a species of conifer in the family Pinaceae. It is found only in China.

References

crassifolia
Least concern plants
Trees of China
Endemic flora of China
Taxonomy articles created by Polbot